The Arizona Flame, formerly the Phoenix Flame and the Scottsdale Flame, were an International Basketball League (IBL) team based in Casa Grande, Arizona. The team played home games at the Arizona Veterans Memorial Coliseum and on the campus of Grand Canyon University. The Flame was the Phoenix's first minor league basketball team since the Phoenix Eclipse folded after the 2001–02 American Basketball Association season. It was owned by Stephen Moss-Kelley, professional basketball player and former IBL all-star. When the team was announced in June 2006, the Flame named their home venue as North Phoenix Baptist Church. By October 2006, the Arizona Republic listed Arizona Veterans Memorial Coliseum as the team's home venue. Tickets for the Flame's opening season were eight dollars for adults and four dollars for children. Maury "Mo" Samilton was the team's head coach in 2007.

On February 19, 2007, the Phoenix Flame owners acquired a new IBL franchise, the Arizona Lightning. The Lightning announced they would begin play for the 2008 IBL season. It was the second active professional minor league basketball team in the Arizona. The Lightning hit the court in 2007 as a traveling team for the IBL.

All-time roster

 Brandon Bardwell
 Cedric Ceballos
 Devin Greene
 Michael Hawkins
 Monte Jones
 Tony Jones
 Robert Keil
 Donnell Knight
 Jamal Livingstone
 Arthur Lewis
 Craig Lewis
 Larry Morinia
 Stephen Moss-Kelley
 Mike Schwertly
 Quincy Shannon
 Maurice Shaw
 James Singleton
 Derrick Smith
 Sascha Stafford
 Del Summers
 Jimmy Tricco
 Omar Waller
 Brandon Wells
 Chris White

Season by season

All-stars
 Jamal Livingston
 Larry Morinia
 Abraham Osayomi

References

External links
 Official team website
 Official IBL website

Sports in Phoenix, Arizona
International Basketball League teams
Basketball teams in Arizona
Casa Grande, Arizona
Basketball teams established in 2007
2007 establishments in Arizona